Local elections were held in Bocaue on May 13, 2013 within the Philippine general election. The voters elected for the elective local posts in the city: the mayor, vice mayor, and eight councilors.

Mayoral and vice mayoral election
Incumbent Mayor Eduardo "Jon Jon" Villanueva Jr. decided to seek reelection under Liberal, however he is still member of Bangon Pilipinas, he faced incumbent vice mayor Jose Santiago, Jr. of PMP, former Mayor Serafin Dela Cruz under Lakas-CMD, and Independent Candidates Rodolfo Dela Cruz and Gregorio Dela Cruz, Sr.

Villanueva's running mate was Councilor Dioscoro Juan, Jr., son of a former Bocaue Mayor Dioscoro Juan.

Results
The candidates for mayor and vice mayor with the highest number of votes wins the seat; they are voted separately, therefore, they may be of different parties when elected.

Mayoral election
Eduardo "Jon-Jon" Villanueva, Jr. is the incumbent.

Vice Mayoralty Election
Incumbent Jose "JJS" Santiago, Jr. is running for mayor.

Municipal Council election
Voting is via plurality-at-large voting: Voters vote for eight candidates and the top eight candidates with the highest number of votes are elected.

Results
The top eight winning councilors duly elected on May 13, 2013 elections:

External links
 Official website of the Commission on Elections
  Official website of National Movement for Free Elections (NAMFREL)
 Official website of the Parish Pastoral Council for Responsible Voting (PPCRV)
 Philippine 2013 Election Results

2013 Philippine local elections
Elections in Bulacan